A warhead is the forward section of a device that contains the explosive agent or toxic (biological, chemical, or nuclear) material that is delivered by a missile, rocket,  torpedo, or bomb.

Classification
Types of warheads include:
Explosive: An explosive charge is used to disintegrate the target, and damage surrounding areas with a blast wave.
Conventional: Chemicals such as gunpowder and high explosives store significant energy within their molecular bonds.  This energy can be released quickly by a trigger, such as an electric spark. Thermobaric weapons enhance the blast effect by utilizing the surrounding atmosphere in their explosive reactions.
Blast: A strong shock wave is provided by the detonation of the explosive.
Fragmentation: Metal fragments are projected at high velocity to cause damage or injury.
Continuous rod: Metal bars welded on their ends form a compact cylinder of interconnected rods, which is violently expanded into a contiguous zig-zag-shaped ring by an explosive detonation. The rapidly expanding ring produces a planar cutting effect that is devastating against military aircraft, which may be designed to be resistant to shrapnel.
Shaped charge: The effect of the explosive charge is focused onto a specially shaped metal liner to project a hypervelocity jet of metal, to perforate heavy armour.
Explosively formed penetrator: Instead of turning a thin metal liner into a focused jet, the detonation wave is directed against a concave metal plate at the front of the warhead, propelling it at high velocity while simultaneously deforming it into a projectile.
Nuclear: A runaway nuclear fission (fission bomb) or nuclear fusion (Thermonuclear weapon) reaction causes immense energy release.
Chemical: A toxic chemical, such as poison gas or nerve gas, is dispersed, which is designed to injure or kill human beings.
Biological: An infectious agent, such as anthrax spores, is dispersed, which is designed to sicken or kill humans.

Often, a biological or chemical warhead will use an explosive charge for rapid dispersal.

Detonators

Type of detonators include:

See also
Guidance system
List of aircraft weapons
List of missiles
Nuclear weapon yield
Missile

References

The Nuclear Weapon Archive. The B61 (Mk-61) Bomb - Intermediate yield strategic and tactical thermonuclear bomb. 
GlobalSecurity.org   The B61 thermonuclear bomb. 
The Brookings Institution. B61 Nuclear Gravity Bomb. 
Stephen I. Schwartz. Atomic Audit - The Costs and Consequences of U.S. Nuclear Weapons Since 1940. Brookings Institution Press 1998 c. 700pp. 
Ogden Air Logistics Center at Hill AFB, Utah. B61 THERMONUCLEAR BOMB. 
National Nuclear Security Administration (NNSA). NNSA Achieves Significant Milestone for B61 Bomb. June 30, 2006. 
Chuck Hansen, U.S. Nuclear Weapons: The Secret History, (New York: Orion Books, 1988), pp. 162–164.

Ammunition
Explosive weapons
Missiles